Kathleen ("Kaye") Webb  (26 January 1914 – 16 January 1996), was a British editor and publisher. She was a recipient of the Eleanor Farjeon Award.

Early life and education
Kathleen Webb was born in Chiswick, London, in 1914, the second of three children of Arthur Webb, a journalist, and Ann (née Stevens), a film and theatre critic. Her paternal great-great-grandfather was W. G. (William George) Webb, publisher of toy theatres in the Victorian era. 

Webb was educated first at a dame school, then at Hornsey High School, and then, in 1926, aged twelve, started boarding at Ashburton School, Ashburton, Devon, where her older brother was already a student. Webb herself described her time there as "bullied, miserable, had jaundice", but was inspired and encouraged by the teacher of English, Ben R. Gibbs, author of textbooks about literature and history. 

She left the school in 1930, and although Gibbs had suggested that she go on to university, she was sent by her parents to stay with a family in Bruges, Belgium, to be "finished".

Career 
Webb's first job after she left school, aged 16, was as an office girl at The Times. In 1931, after her time in Belgium, she was employed as editor's secretary at Picturegoer, where she was "George the Answerman". At some point, she also worked for Mickey Mouse Weekly, where she was paid 2d per answer to reply to children's letters. She later worked for motor magazines Caravan World and Sports Car. She joined Picture Post as a secretary in 1938; and in 1941 became assistant editor of the magazine Lilliput.

She remained at Lilliput until her marriage in 1948, after which she began working freelance, writing features for the News Chronicle and broadcasting on Woman's Hour, among other commissions. In 1955 she was invited by John Grigg, the owner, to edit the children's literary magazine The Young Elizabethan (afterwards retitled The Elizabethan). In 1961, she became editor of Puffin Books, remaining until 1979. In 1967 she founded the Puffin Club, which she ran until 1981 (also editing its magazine, Puffin Post).

Personal life 

Webb was married three times: each of her marriages ended in divorce. Her third marriage (1948–1967) was to Ronald Searle, who was the father of her son and daughter. She was cremated at Kensal Green Cemetery.

Archives
Webb's archive and working library are held in the Seven Stories centre for children's books collection, based in Newcastle upon Tyne.

Notes

Sources
 (Biography)

External links
Helen Brown, Kaye Webb's Puffin Adventure, Daily Telegraph, 30 April 2010.
Kathleen (Kaye) Webb, Seven Stories archive index

1914 births
1996 deaths
Members of the Order of the British Empire
Place of birth missing
Place of death missing
Penguin Books people
20th-century British journalists